The Royal School of Signals is a military training establishment that is part of the United Kingdom's Defence School of Communications and Information Systems.  It is at Blandford Camp in Dorset. The soldiers and officers who are attending courses at the school are assigned to the 11th Signal Regiment, the training regiment of the Royal Corps of Signals.

History
The school was founded in 1869 at Chatham in Kent as the Signal Wing of the Royal School of Military Engineering. It moved to Houghton Regis in Bedfordshire in 1915, Maresfield Park in Sussex in 1920, Catterick Camp in North Yorkshire in 1925 and Blandford Camp in Dorset in 1967. It became the Royal School of Signals in 1992.

Composition 
The current units controlled by the school include:

 11th (Royal Corps of Signals) Signal Regiment, Royal Corps of Signals (only 4 squadrons present and one affiliate squadron)
 Regimental Headquarters
1 (Fowler) Squadron (Part of 2 Army Training Regiment)
2 (Catterick) Squadron
3 (Harrogate) Squadron
 4 (Military Training) Squadron
 5 (Maresfield) Squadron

Training
The school trains the officers and soldiers of the Royal Corps of Signals, together with signallers and computer specialists from across the British Army. Students also come from the Royal Air Force.

The school also features the home of the Cadet Forces Signals Training Team (CFSTT) which offers several week-long residential signals courses each year to both cadet and adult members of the Army Cadet Force, Combined Cadet Force, Air Training Corps, and Sea Cadet Corps, at Blandford. The Cadet Forces Signals Training Team also runs a yearly signals competition, exercise Rolling Thunder.

Facilities
Whilst soldiers are at Blandford, their signals training is complemented by sport and adventurous training, based on the Physical and Recreational Training Centre which comprises indoor and outdoor climbing walls, athletics track, astroturf pitch, judo dojo, tennis courts, squash courts, weight training area and gymnasium. Off site, the School has the facilities and instructors to organise sailing, windsurfing, diving, hill walking, rock climbing, mountain biking and canoeing.

Notable commanding officers
Ashley Truluck (1990–1993)

See also
 Units of the Royal Corps of Signals

References

External links
11th (Royal School of Signals) Signal Regiment

Royal Corps of Signals